Nano-ITX is a computer motherboard form factor first proposed by VIA Technologies at CeBIT in March 2003, and implemented in late 2005. Nano-ITX boards measure , and are fully integrated, very low power consumption motherboards with many uses, but targeted at smart digital entertainment devices such as DVRs, set-top boxes, media centers, car PCs, and thin devices. Nano-ITX motherboards have slots for SO-DIMM.

There are four Nano-ITX motherboard product lines so far, VIA's EPIA N, EPIA NL, EPIA NX, and the VIA EPIA NR. These boards are available from a wide variety of manufacturers supporting numerous different CPU platforms.

Udoo has now released at least 1 nano-ITX board: the Udoo Bolt.

See also 
Mini-ITX
Pico-ITX
Mobile-ITX
EPIA, mini-ITX and nano-ITX motherboards from VIA
Ultra-Mobile PC
Minimig, is an open source re-implementation of an Amiga 500 in Nano-ITX format

References

External links
 Jetway Computer Corp. J8F9 AMD Nano-ITX Mainboards Nano ITX Manufacturer, Mainboard OEMs, Daughterboards etc.
VIA EPIA N-Series Nano-ITX Mainboard
VIA EPIA NL-Series Nano-ITX Mainboard
VIA EPIA NX-Series Nano-ITX Mainboard
VIA EPIA NR-Series Nano-ITX Mainboard

Digital video recorders
Motherboard
Motherboard form factors
Set-top box